Metropolitan Elias Audi (born 1941, Enfeh, Koura) is the current Metropolitan bishop of the Greek Orthodox Church of Antioch for the Archdiocese of Beirut in Lebanon.

Elias Audi was born during 1941, in predominantly Eastern Orthodox village of Anfeh, El-Koura, north Lebanon. He has a B.A. in Philosophy Lebanon; he also has a B.A. in Theology (Saint Vladimir's Orthodox Theological Seminary, New York, 1969).

In 1969, he was promoted to the priesthood. In 1979, he was elected Greek Orthodox Archbishop of Beirut and appointed Patriarchal Vicar Lebanon. He was elected by the Holy Antiochian Council on 5 February 1980. On 9 April 1980, he arrived to the Orthodox Archdiocese of Beirut in Achrafieh to assume his post.

References 

 https://web.archive.org/web/20080820002722/http://www.wcc-usa.org/resources/living-letters/05-nov-01.html
 https://web.archive.org/web/20071021002437/http://www.stgeorgehospital.org/STGHB/PDF/june2002%20issue4.pdf

Eastern Orthodox Christians from Lebanon
Living people
1941 births
Bishops of the Greek Orthodox Church of Antioch
Christian clergy in Lebanon